Blanche of Burgundy ( 1296 –  1326) was Queen of France and Navarre for a few months in 1322 through her marriage to King Charles IV the Fair.  The daughter of Count Otto IV of Burgundy and Countess Mahaut of Artois, she was led to a disastrous marriage by her mother's ambition. Eight years before her husband's accession to the thrones, Blanche was arrested and found guilty of adultery with a Norman knight. Her sister-in-law, Margaret of Burgundy, suffered the same fate, while her sister Joan was acquitted. Blanche was imprisoned and not released even after becoming queen, until her marriage was annulled when she was moved to the coast of Normandy. The date and place of her death are unknown; the mere fact that she died was simply mentioned on the occasion of her husband's third marriage in April 1326.

Early life 
Blanche was the younger daughter of Otto IV, Count of Burgundy, and Mahaut, Countess of Artois. Her father died in 1303, leaving the county to Blanche's elder sister, Joan. Joan was supposed to marry Louis, the heir of Philip IV of France, but Philip changed his mind and arranged for her to marry his second son, Philip, in 1307. The Countess of Artois was proud of this achievement and quickly started negotiating her younger daughter's marriage to Charles, King Philip's third son, offering a huge dowry. The negotiations were successful and on 23 September 1307, the eleven-year-old Blanche and thirteen-year-old Charles concluded a marriage contract. The marriage ceremony was hastily performed at Countess Mahaut's castle in Hesdin in January 1308.

Adultery accusations 

In 1313, Blanche's sister-in-law and brother-in-law, Isabella and Edward II of England, visited King Philip IV. Isabella presented her brothers and sisters-in-law with embroidered coin purses. Later that year, upon their return to London, Isabella and Edward held a banquet during which Isabella noticed that the coin purses she had given to Blanche and Margaret were now in the possession of the Norman knights Gautier and Philippe d'Aunay. From that she concluded that the brothers were having relationships with her sisters-in-law. When she visited Paris again in 1314, she informed King Philip about her suspicions. Blanche's sister Joan was accused of hiding the affair and later of participating in it.

Trial and imprisonment

Acting quickly, King Philip ordered the arrest of all his daughters-in-law and the knights. Following torture, the d'Aunays confessed to adultery and admitted that it had lasted three years. The Blanche and Margaret were tried before the Paris Parlement and were found guilty of adultery. Their heads were shaven and both were sentenced to life imprisonment underground in Château Gaillard, while the d'Aunays were condemned to death and duly executed. Blanche's first child, a son named Philip, was born around 5 January 1314, so presumably his paternity was not challenged; her second child, a daughter named Joan, was born in 1315 after the trial. Despite her disgrace, Blanche remained in contact with her ambitious mother and often received gifts from her.

Queenship and death 

On Philip V's death on 3 January 1322, Blanche's husband, Charles, inherited the crown. Blanche thus became queen of France and Navarre, but at Charles' request, Pope John XXII declared their marriage null and void on 19 May 1322. Both Charles and Blanche received permission to remarry. Both of her children died in infancy, Philip by the end of March 1322 and Joan on 17 May 1321.  

Though she was replaced immediately by Marie of Luxembourg, there was no hope for Blanche to remarry, as she was sent to Gavray Castle. There is no evidence that supports the common belief that she died as a nun at Maubuisson Abbey. Having spent eight years imprisoned underground, the former queen suffered from poor health. The date of her eventual death is unknown; the Pope mentioned her as dead in a document of 5 April 1326 issuing a dispensation for the marriage of her former husband and Jeanne d'Évreux.

In fiction
Blanche is a character in Les Rois maudits (The Accursed Kings), a series of French historical novels by Maurice Druon.

Family tree

References

Sources

External links 
 Blanche de Bourgogne

|-

1296 births
1326 deaths
French queens consort
Navarrese royal consorts
Chalon-Arlay
Repudiated queens
13th-century French people
13th-century French women
14th-century French people
14th-century French women
People convicted of adultery